Morris Russell Peterson Jr. (born August 26, 1977) is an American retired professional basketball player who played eleven seasons in the National Basketball Association (NBA). He played college basketball for Michigan State University, where in the 1999–2000 season he led the Spartans to the national title as Big Ten Player of the Year. He is also a cousin of former NBA player Jonathan Bender.

College career 
Born in Flint, Michigan, Peterson played collegiate basketball at Michigan State University, and helped lead them to the 2000 NCAA title.

In his senior year at MSU, Peterson led the team in scoring, field goal percentage, and free throw percentage. He had a team-high 30 double-digit scoring efforts. He was voted Big Ten Player of the Year and First Team All-Big Ten, and he placed as first or second team All-American on five different polls.

He was selected 21st overall by the Raptors in the 2000 NBA draft, and was a starter in the majority of their games during his first three seasons. On January 17, 2009, MSU retired his number 42 with MSU's other all-time greats before their game against the Illinois Fighting Illini.

NBA career

Toronto Raptors 
Drafted in the first round by the Raptors in 2000, Peterson was a fan favorite from the moment he stepped on the floor.
While enjoying some early success in his professional career, Peterson's production faced a steady decline, before stepping up in the wake of the new era of Raptor youngsters being ushered in, taking on a more expansive leadership role and transforming himself into an elite perimeter defender, a clutch performer and consistent scorer. He is known for his three-point shooting, acrobatic shots, defense, and fearless driving to the basket.

On December 28, 2005, Peterson set a record for career games played as a Raptor, surpassing Alvin Williams with 418 games played. Peterson also leads the NBA in longest consecutive games played, appearing in 371 straight until November 22, 2006, when he missed his first game in over four years.

Peterson posted career highs in points and rebounds averaging 16.8 points and 4.6 rebounds and threw in 2.3 assists per game through 82 games played in the 2005–06 season.

Perhaps the biggest highlight of his career occurred against the Washington Wizards on March 30, 2007 in a game that helped determine the two teams' playoff seeding. The Raptors trailed 109–106 with only 3.8 seconds left and no timeouts remaining. The Wizards' Michael Ruffin intercepted the full-court pass and tried to toss the ball high into the air so that the clock would run out. But the ball slipped from his hands and was not thrown high enough. There was still enough time on the clock as Peterson caught the ball and launched a "Hail Mary" three-pointer and sank it to send the game into overtime. Peterson only played 55 seconds in the game, with his first shift beginning with only 9.3 seconds left in the fourth quarter.  The Raptors went on to defeat the Wizards, 123–118.

After signing Bryan Colangelo, it became apparent that the re-building process of the Raptors would not include Peterson. It was only a matter of time before his contract expired in the summer of 2007 that he would be gone.

New Orleans Hornets 
On July 13, 2007, the New Orleans Hornets signed Peterson to a four-year contract, worth $23 million.

Oklahoma City Thunder 
On July 8, 2010, the Hornets traded Peterson along with #11 overall pick in the 2010 draft, Cole Aldrich, to the Oklahoma City Thunder for two 2010 first-round draft picks (#21, Craig Brackins and #26, Quincy Pondexter).

Charlotte Bobcats 
On February 24, 2011, Peterson was traded to the Charlotte Bobcats along with D.J. White in exchange for Nazr Mohammed. He was waived four days later when his contract was bought out by the Bobcats. Peterson's final NBA game was played on December 12, 2010 in a 106 - 77 win over the Cleveland Cavaliers where he recorded 2 points.

Broadcasting career 
On January 14, 2015, TSN announced that Peterson would join their broadcast team as an analyst. For the network's package of Toronto Raptors games, Peterson joined TSN's broadcast team of Jack Armstrong, Leo Rautins, Matt Devlin, and Rod Black both in the TSN Studio and on-site at the Air Canada Centre in Toronto, Ontario. Peterson will also deliver analysis for SportsCentre and appear throughout the network's expanded NCAA coverage, including TSN's wall-to-wall coverage of NCAA March Madness. As of 2017, Peterson is no longer an analyst on TSN.

Restaurant 
On January 23, 2018 Peterson, in a partnership with Viktor Palushaj, opened "MoPetes Sports Retreat" just outside of his hometown of Flint in neighboring Flint Township, Michigan.  The menu features Michigan inspired dishes such as The Flintstones Combos, Flint-Town Reuben sandwich, the Izzo sub, and The National Champ Philly cheese steak sandwich.

Accolades 
 Career-high: March 31, 2006 Peterson scored a career-best 38 points vs. the Phoenix Suns.
 First-round draft choice (21st overall) by Toronto in 2000.
 Recorded his 800th career three-point field goal April 3, 2005 vs. the Detroit Pistons.
 Had a career-high 14 rebounds April 8, 2005.
 Held the longest active streak of games played, with 371, ending in 2006.
 Held Raptors career records for games played (542) and 3-point field goals (801).

NBA career statistics

Regular season 

|-
| style="text-align:left;"| 
| style="text-align:left;"| Toronto
| 80 || 49 || 22.6 || .431 || .382 || .717 || 3.2 || 1.3 || .8 || .2 || 9.3
|-
| style="text-align:left;"| 
| style="text-align:left;"| Toronto
| 63 || 56 || 31.6 || .438 || .364 || .751 || 3.5 || 2.4 || 1.2 || .2 || 14.0
|-
| style="text-align:left;"| 
| style="text-align:left;"| Toronto
| 82 || 80 || 36.0 || .392 || .337 || .789 || 4.4 || 2.3 || 1.1 || .4 || 14.1
|-
| style="text-align:left;"| 
| style="text-align:left;"| Toronto
| 82 || 29 || 26.2 || .405 || .371 || .809 || 3.2 || 1.4 || 1.1 || .2 || 8.3
|-
| style="text-align:left;"| 
| style="text-align:left;"| Toronto
| 82 || 61 || 30.6 || .420 || .385 || .832 || 4.1 || 2.1 || 1.1 || .2 || 12.5
|-
| style="text-align:left;"| 
| style="text-align:left;"| Toronto
| 82 || 77 || 38.3 || .436 || .395 || .820 || 4.6 || 2.3 || 1.3 || .2 || 16.8
|-
| style="text-align:left;"| 
| style="text-align:left;"| Toronto
| 71 || 12 || 21.3 || .429 || .359 || .683 || 3.3 || .7 || .6 || .2 || 8.9
|-
| style="text-align:left;"| 
| style="text-align:left;"| New Orleans
| 76 || 76 || 23.6 || .417 || .394 || .765 || 2.7 || .9 || .6 || .1 || 8.0
|-
| style="text-align:left;"| 
| style="text-align:left;"| New Orleans
| 43 || 9 || 12.0 || .399 || .388 || .632 || 2.0 || .4 || .3 || .1 || 4.4
|-
| style="text-align:left;"| 
| style="text-align:left;"| New Orleans
| 46 || 39 || 21.2 || .385 || .363 || .611 || 2.7 || .9 || .5 || .1 || 7.1
|-
| style="text-align:left;"| 
| style="text-align:left;"| Oklahoma City
| 4 || 0 || 5.8 || .400 || .000 || .000 || .8 || .3 || .0 || .0 || 1.0
|- class="sortbottom"
| style="text-align:center;" colspan="2"| Career
| 711 || 488 || 27.2 || .418 || .373 || .773 || 3.5 || 1.5 || .9 || .2 || 10.7

Playoffs 

|-
| style="text-align:left;"| 2001
| style="text-align:left;"| Toronto
| 8 || 3 || 13.8 || .514 || .444 || .750 || 1.5 || 1.9 || .8 || .0 || 5.4
|-
| style="text-align:left;"| 2002
| style="text-align:left;"| Toronto
| 5 || 5 || 30.8 || .367 || .118 || .800 || 2.8 || 2.2 || 1.0 || .6 || 9.2
|-
| style="text-align:left;"| 2007
| style="text-align:left;"| Toronto
| 6 || 2 || 30.5 || .517 || .500 || .833 || 4.5 || .3 || .3 || .3 || 6.8
|-
| style="text-align:left;"| 2008
| style="text-align:left;"| New Orleans
| 12 || 12 || 23.1 || .485 || .471 || .667 || 2.6 || .6 || .5 || .2 || 7.2
|-
| style="text-align:left;"| 2009
| style="text-align:left;"| New Orleans
| 2 || 0 || 10.5 || .200 || .333 || .750 || 1.5 || .5 || .5 || .0 || 3.0
|- class="sortbottom"
| style="text-align:center;" colspan="2"| Career
| 33 || 22 || 22.6 || .457 || .387 || .767 || 2.6 || 1.1 || .6 || .2 || 6.7

References

External links 
 NBA Profile
Michigan State profile
 

1977 births
Living people
African-American basketball players
All-American college men's basketball players
American expatriate basketball people in Canada
American men's basketball players
Basketball players from Flint, Michigan
Michigan State Spartans men's basketball players
New Orleans Hornets players
Oklahoma City Thunder players
Shooting guards
Small forwards
Toronto Raptors draft picks
Toronto Raptors players
21st-century African-American sportspeople
20th-century African-American sportspeople